Kishore Thapa is an Indian politician. He was elected to the Manipur Legislative Assembly from Kangpokpi constituency in 1974, 1980 and 1984 Manipur Legislative Assembly election as a member of the Indian National Congress. Later, he joined Samata Party (now led by Uday Mandal its President).

References

2016 deaths
Indian National Congress politicians
Samata Party politicians
People from Kangpokpi district
Manipur MLAs 1974–1979
Manipur MLAs 1980–1984
Manipur MLAs 1985–1990